In the Anglo-Saxon epic Beowulf, Æschere is Hrothgar's most trusted advisor who is killed by Grendel's mother in her attack on Heorot after Grendel's death. His name is composed of the Germanic elements Æsc, meaning 'ash', and here, meaning 'army'. King Hrothgar describes Æschere as 'min runwita ond min rædbora' (1325), which implies that he knows mysteries or enigmas and also has a duty to explain those mysteries aloud to a community. But by killing and decapitating Æschere, Grendel's mother highlights an anxiety within the poem about things that defy human interpretation. Beowulf and his Geatish warriors find Æschere's severed head at the entrance to Grendel's mother's lair.

References

Bibliography
 Beowulf, lines 1323-1329 and 1417-1421
  

Characters in Beowulf
Male characters in literature